Sven Hannawald (born 9 November 1974) is a German former ski jumper. Having competed from 1992 to 2004, his career highlight was winning the 2002 Four Hills Tournament, on that occasion becoming the first athlete to win all four events of said tournament. He also finished runner-up twice in the World Cup season, winning four medals at the Ski Jumping World Championships, as well as three medals each at the Winter Olympics and Ski Flying World Championships.

Early life 
Hannawald was born in Erlabrunn and grew up in the nearby town of Johanngeorgenstadt by SC Dynamo Johanngeorgenstadt in the Ore Mountains. At age twelve, he was sent to a special school for young athletes in Klingenthal (SG Dynamo Klingenthal), also in Saxony. In 1991 his family moved to Jettingen-Scheppach near Ulm where he transferred to the Furtwangen Ski Boarding School, where he completed an apprenticeship in Communication Electronics.

Ski jumping career 

In 1998, Hannawald won a silver medal at the 1998 Ski Flying World Championships in Oberstdorf as well as a silver medal at the Olympic Games in Nagano in the team large hill event.

In the 1998/99 season, he finished fifth place overall in World Cup Ski Jumping. At the world championships in Ramsau, he won a silver medal in the individual large hill behind Martin Schmitt, as well as winning a gold medal in the team large hill event.

In 2000, Hannawald won the Ski-flying World Championships in Vikersund. He also won the ski jumping competition at the Holmenkollen ski festival that year.

In the 2000/01 season, Hannawald won gold in the team large hill event and bronze in the team normal hill event at the world championships in Lahti.

The following winter of 2001/02 was the most successful of his career: Hannawald ended second in the World Cup, winning all four Individual jumping titles at the Four Hills Tournament, the first to do so. He successfully defended his title of Ski Flying World Champion. At the Olympic Winter Games in Salt Lake City, he won gold in the team large hill and silver in the individual normal hill, and was even nominated for Sportsman of the Year in Germany. Despite all of his successes, however, Hannawald could not top Adam Malysz in the overall World Cup ranking.

In the 2002/03 season, he finished again second in the world rankings and managed to set another highlight of his career: at the Worldcup competition in Willingen, Germany , he  became the third person in history to achieve perfect marks from all five judges (20 points maximum) – 27 years after the first one (Anton Innauer) and five years after the second one (Kazuyoshi Funaki). This mark has been matched only about one hour later at the same World Cup competition by Hideharu Miyahira, who finished sixth. Then it took another six years until Wolfgang Loitzl at Bischofshofen, Austria in 2009 during the 2008/09 Four Hills Tournament  became the fifth one.

In the 2003/04 season, Hannawald performed well below personal expectations. His best result was fourth in Trondheim. As a consequence of that, Hannawald ended his season prematurely. On 29 April 2004, he revealed that he was suffering from burnout and had put himself into psychiatric treatment. During this time, Hannawald managed to recover and reappeared to the public.

On 3 August 2005, he ended his career as a ski jumper, explaining through his managers that, after successfully dealing with his burnout, he no longer wished to suffer the stresses of professional sport.

Post-retirement
On 26 September 2008, Hannawald signed a two-year contract with the football club TSV Burgau of the German Kreisliga, where he played as a striker.

In 2010, Hannawald gave his debut as a Touring Car racing driver in the ADAC GT Masters. He drove his first race on 10 April 2010 in Oschersleben.

World Cup results

Standings

Wins

References

External links 

1974 births
Living people
People from Erzgebirgskreis
German male ski jumpers
Holmenkollen Ski Festival winners
Olympic ski jumpers of Germany
Olympic gold medalists for Germany
Olympic silver medalists for Germany
Association football forwards
Ski jumpers at the 1998 Winter Olympics
German footballers
Footballers from Saxony
Ski jumpers at the 2002 Winter Olympics
German racing drivers
Olympic medalists in ski jumping
Sportspeople from Saxony
Racing drivers from Saxony
FIS Nordic World Ski Championships medalists in ski jumping
Medalists at the 2002 Winter Olympics
Medalists at the 1998 Winter Olympics
ADAC GT Masters drivers
Audi Sport TT Cup drivers
Recipients of the Order of Merit of Baden-Württemberg